Haman is a character of the Qur'an where he appears as court official and high priest of the pharaoh or (Firaun), and associated with him in his court at the time of the Islamic prophet (Musa), Moses in Christianity and Judaism. The name Haman, however, also appears in the biblical Book of Esther where Haman is a counselor of Ahasuerus, king of Persia and an enemy of the Jews. The relationship between the Biblical and Quranic Haman has been a topic of debate.

Qur'anic Narrative
The name Haman appears six times throughout the Qur'an, four times with Pharaoh and twice by himself, where God sends Moses to invite Pharaoh, Haman and their people to monotheism, and to seek protection of the Israelites Haman and Pharaoh were tormenting. 

Referring to Moses as a sorcerer and a liar the Pharaoh rejected Moses' call to worship the God of Moses and refused to set the children of Israel free. The Pharaoh commissioned Haman to build a tall tower using fire-cast bricks so that the Pharaoh could climb far up and see the God of Moses. The Pharaoh, Haman, and their army in chariots pursuing the fleeing children of Israel drowned in the Red Sea as the parted water closed up on them. The Pharaoh's submission to God at the moment of death and total destruction was rejected but his dead body was saved as a lesson for posterity.

High Priest of Amun

Some have proposed that the name Haman, like Pharaoh in the Qur'an and Old Testament is not a proper name, but a title. The description of Haman in the Qur'an serving in both a priestly religious role and that of one who's in charge of building projects answerable to the Pharaoh himself draws parallels with the High Priest of Amun. 

McAuliffe's Encyclopaedia of the Qurʾān among other sources relates "Haman" to be the Arabized form of "Ha-Amana," a title which roughly translates to incarnate of (the God) Amun or King of Amun and was utilized by the high priest.

References

People of the Quran
Ancient Egyptian viziers